Indian School Sohar (ISS) is an English co-educational school for Indians in the Al Hambar area of  Sohar, Oman. It was founded in 1982, and is managed by members of the Indian business community. The school has students from kindergarten to Class 12 and is affiliated with the Central Board of Secondary Education in India.

History 
ISS was named for its student community, and Asha Sakrani was its first principal. The school was founded to educate Indian children in and around Sohar. There were eight students initially; the school was in a single room, with Sakrani as the only teacher and the principal. Students sat on mats, and the furniture was a table and chair. As enrollment and faculty increased, N. Subramanian became principal in 1992 and the school later moved near the souq. CBSE accreditation for class ten was received in 1994, and the following year the first class took the class-ten board (CBSE) examination. In 2001, class twelve received CBSE affiliation.

The school grew from one room in 1982 to three two-story buildings with 38 classrooms. Sanchita Verma became principal in 2012, replacing J.K. Arora.  Its logo reads "From darkness to light" in Sanskrit and English, with a lamp in the center flanked by a pair of swans and an open book (symbolizing learning).

Facilities 
The school has physics, chemistry, biology, three computer, Junior Sc. and two mathematics laboratories. Two art-and-craft rooms, three libraries, and music rooms are also available. All the classes from KG to XII have multimedia smart boards to augment traditional teaching methods. ISS offers ICSE-formatted education to over 3,500 students. The sections of each class were increased, with some going up to J grade. Kindergarten classes are held in a separate building. In 2017, the construction of a Recreational building had been initiated and was inaugurated in 2019.  It is spacious and has air conditioning, even in corridors.

Academics 
In April 2019 the school operated on a 7:40 am–2:10 pm schedule, Sunday to Thursday; this included eight classes and a lunch break. The school has a uniform dress code. In the 2011 AISSCE (Class 12 Board exams), students scored 99 in chemistry, 98 in informatics practices, 97 in biology, 96 in mathematics, 95 in English and 95 in physics. Thirty-six students received a CGPA score of 10 in the 2016 Class 10 CBSE examination.
The gulf topper in Sc stream in 2015 was from Indian school Sohar. Class 12 results were also good.

Extracurricular activities

Scouts and Guides

Sports
ISS entered Gulf-zone events in 2009. The school has won a cricket championship and has finished second in football. Its annual athletic meet features aerobics, a P.T. display, races, shot put, discus throw and gymnastics. Teachers participate in co-curricular activities; in 2009, seven students and a teacher participated in Indian national athletics.

Awards 
ISS won the Shastra Pratibha Contest in 2008 and 2009 in the sub-senior group, receiving the Indian Ambassador's Rolling Trophy. The contest is organised by Science India Forum, with the trophy awarded to the winning school. A school team was runner-up in the school-team category in the annual Times of Oman quiz. The finals were held on 17 April 2009 in the Qurum amphitheater. One hundred seventy-nine teams participated from all over Oman, and ISS finished fourth; Indian ambassador to Oman H.E. Anil Wadhwa visited the school. ISS organises competitive events for students to hone their skills.

ISS has been part of the national news. The school has participated in international Olympiads, including the 2009 International Informatics Olympiad. Seven students secured a perfect 10 in the 2011 Class 10 (AISSE) exams. Four students from the 2010–2011 Class 12 received INSPIRE scholarships (Rs 400,000 over five years) from the Department of Science and Technology for reaching the top one percent in the 2011 CBSE Class 12 Board exams. A Class 11 student won third prize in the Ambassador's Polemic Challenge and was congratulated by Anil Wadhwa, ambassador of India to Oman. ISS students topped the Young Bulls competition held in 2012. The ISS annual Sports Day has been covered by the Times of Oman. The school received the Ambassador's Trophy for most improved school in Oman from Ambassador J.S. Mukul at a conference at Muscat.

In 2014 CBSE Board (AISSCE) Class 12 results were very encouraging. Thirty-three students scored 95% and above marks in English, Fourteen secured 95% marks in Mathematics.

References

External links
 Official website
 http://www.indianschoolmag.blogspot.com 
 ISS.blogspot.com

Educational institutions established in 1982
Indian international schools in Oman
Sohar
1982 establishments in Oman